Tahibacter aquaticus is a Gram-negative, aerobic, non-spore-formin, rod-shaped and non-motile bacterium from the genus of Tahibacter which has been isolated from a drinking water supply system from Budapest in Hungary.

References

Xanthomonadales
Bacteria described in 2014